Gemma Cuff (born April 7, 1979) is a female former British gymnast.

Gymnastics career
Cuff represented England and won a silver medal in the team event, at the 1998 Commonwealth Games in Kuala Lumpur, Malaysia.

She was the National Junior Gymnast of The Year in 1992 when based with the Coalville Gymnastics Club  and was three times winner of the British team title (1995, 1996 and 1997) when with the Heathrow Gymnastics Club.

Personal life
She attended the St David's School, Middlesex and moved to the United States attending Pennsylvania State University.

References

1979 births
Living people
British female artistic gymnasts
Gymnasts at the 1998 Commonwealth Games
Commonwealth Games silver medallists for England
Commonwealth Games medallists in gymnastics
Medallists at the 1998 Commonwealth Games